Sarahsville, California may refer to:
 Bath, California
 Clinton, California